Patrick Beneforti (born 28 October 1980) is a French former professional footballer who played as a midfielder.

He played on the professional level in Ligue 1 for SC Bastia and Ligue 2 for LB Châteauroux and FC Istres.

He played two matches for SC Bastia in the 2001 UEFA Intertoto Cup.

External links
 
 Patrick Beneforti profile at foot-national.com

1980 births
Living people
French footballers
Association football midfielders
Footballers from Corsica
Ligue 1 players
Ligue 2 players
Championnat National players
Championnat National 2 players
Championnat National 3 players
SC Bastia players
LB Châteauroux players
FC Istres players
CA Bastia players
AS Furiani-Agliani players